Retinal degeneration is a retinopathy which consists in the deterioration of the retina caused by the progressive death of its cells. There are several reasons for retinal degeneration, including artery or vein occlusion, diabetic retinopathy, R.L.F./R.O.P. (retrolental fibroplasia/ retinopathy of prematurity), or disease (usually hereditary). These may present in many different ways such as impaired vision, night blindness, retinal detachment, light sensitivity, tunnel vision, and loss of peripheral vision to total loss of vision. Of the retinal degenerative diseases retinitis pigmentosa (RP) is a very important example.

Inherited retinal degenerative disorders in humans exhibit genetic and phenotypic heterogeneity in their underlying causes and clinical outcomes. These retinopathies affect approximately one in 2000 individuals worldwide. A wide variety of causes have been attributed to retinal degeneration, such as disruption of genes that are involved in phototransduction, biosynthesis and folding of the rhodopsin molecule, and the structural support of the retina. Mutations in the rhodopsin gene account for 25% to 30% (30% to 40% according to) of all cases of autosomal dominant retinitis pigmentosa (adRP) in North America. There are many mechanisms of retinal degeneration attributed to rhodopsin mutations or mutations that involve or affect the function of rhodopsin. One mechanism of retinal degeneration is rhodopsin overexpression. Another mechanism, whereby a mutation caused a truncated rhodopsin, was found to affect rod function and increased the rate of photoreceptor degeneration.

Photoreceptor cell death

Photoreceptor cell death is the eventual outcome of retinal degeneration. Without proper function of the photoreceptor cells, vision is not possible. Irreversible loss of these cells has been attributed as a cause of blindness in many retinal degenerative disorders, including RP. The exact mechanism of photoreceptor cell death is not clearly understood. Among potential causes is the endocytosis of stable complexes formed between rhodopsin and its regulatory protein arrestin in certain mutants. Various studies have also documented that over-expression of rhodopsin itself (mutations in genes involved in the termination of rhodopsin signaling activity have been shown to cause degeneration by persistent activation of the phototransduction cascade ) causes photoreceptor cell death and may induce photoreceptor cell loss in transgenic animals expressing truncated rhodopsin. Yet another mechanism may be prolonged photoreceptor responses and also abnormal rhodopsin deactivation may induce outer segment shortening and eventual photoreceptor death.

In RP photoreceptor cell death is believed to occur by programmed cell death or apoptosis.

Retinitis pigmentosa

Retinitis pigmentosa is a progressive neurodegenerative disorder, which affects 1 in 3,000 individuals and affects between 50000 and 100000 people in the United States. Autosomal dominant RP accounts for approximately 15% of these cases. Autosomal dominant retinitis pigmentosa (ADRP) is a genetically heterogeneous group of inherited retinal degenerations that cause blindness in humans.

RP begins with death of rod photoreceptor cells, which are the only cells in the retina to express rhodopsin and which express it as their most abundant protein. Eventually, loss of rod cells leads to loss of cone cells (cone photoreceptors), the mainstay of human vision. Symptoms of RP include loss of sensitivity to dim light, abnormal visual function, and characteristic bone spicule deposits of pigment in the retina. Affected individuals progressively lose visual field and visual acuity, and photoreceptor cell death can ultimately lead to blindness. A prominent early clinical feature of retinitis pigmentosa is the loss of night vision as a result of death of rod photoreceptor cells. Proper expression of the wild-type rhodopsin gene is essential for the development and sustained function of photoreceptor cells.

Mutations in the human rhodopsin that affect its folding, trafficking and activity are the most commonly encountered causes of retinal degeneration in affected patients. A single base-substitution at the codon position 23 in the human opsin gene (P23H) is the most common cause of ADRP in American patients. ADRP due to rhodopsin mutations has a wide range of clinical presentation and severity. Before 1991, phenotypic evidence pointed to different subsets of ADRP with varying prognoses. Molecular classification of ADRP and further sub-classification based on the region of the mutation in the rhodopsin gene allowed better prediction of a particular disease course. But even within these specific subsets, the prognosis is influenced by the specific mutation itself.

Rhodopsin and its function in vision

Rhodopsin  is the opsin of rod photoreceptor cells, which are the only cells in the retina that express rhodopsin and which express it as their most abundant protein. It is an integral part of the visual cascade.  It is a G-protein-coupled receptor activated by light that initiates the phototransduction cascade (visual transduction cascade taking place in photoreceptor rod outer segments.) converting light signals to electrophysiological signals in retinal neurons. This photo-activated signal transduction process is essential for vision.

The structure and function of rhodopsin and the gene encoding it have been the subjects of intense scrutiny for many years because rhodopsin serves as a useful model for understanding the largest receptor family in the human genome, the G protein-coupled receptors, and because defects in the rhodopsin gene are the most common cause of the most common inherited blinding disease, retinitis pigmentosa.

Rhodopsin Mutation
The human rhodopsin gene is the locus for numerous alleles linked to the neurodegenerative disease retinitis pigmentosa. Mutations in the rhodopsin gene account for 25% to 30% (30% to 40% according to ) of all cases of autosomal dominant retinitis pigmentosa (ADRP).  Over 100 distinct mutations in the light-sensing molecule rhodopsin are known to cause (adRP). Most of these mutations are missense mutations affecting single amino acid residues in the rhodopsin protein. These mutations affect rhodopsin transport to the outer segments of rod photoreceptor cells, rhodopsin folding, and rhodopsin endocytosis. Mutations in the human rhodopsin that affect its folding, trafficking and activity are the most commonly encountered causes of retinal degeneration in patients affected by RP. A single base-substitution mutation of codon 23 of the rhodopsin gene in which proline is changed to histidine (Pro23His) in the human opsin gene accounts for the largest fraction of rhodopsin mutations observed in the United States and is the most common cause of ADRP in American patients.

In 1990, the Pro23His mutation of the rhodopsin gene was reported as the first mutation associated with RP. This mutation has been described only in the United States, where it continues to be the most commonly described gene defect in RP.
The phenotype of the RP associated with the P23H mutation is characteristically relatively mild but variable.
Multiple studies have demonstrated that the degree of severity of a given mutation in the rhodopsin gene is based in large part on its position in the rhodopsin molecule—intradiscal, transmembrane, or cytoplasmic. Intradiscal mutations tend to be less severe, whereas mutations affecting cytoplasmic domains and retinol binding sites tend to be very severe. The severity of cytoplasmic mutations affecting maintenance of photoreceptor cell polarity, such as those at the C-terminus (sorting signal of rhodopsin) may result from inappropriate intracellular transport of the molecule.

Some research has described transgenic mouse mutants that cause degeneration by prolonged activation of the phototransduction cascade. In this research null mutations in the rhodopsin kinase and arrestin genes, each of which plays a role in terminating rhodopsin activity, caused light-dependent retinal degeneration.

Rhodopsin C-terminal mutations
A fraction of rhodopsin mutations alter the C-terminal tail of the protein, such as the point mutations P347L, P347S, P347R, and V345M.3–5 In addition, two frameshift mutations (fs 341del and fs 341-343del) are predicted to add additional residues to the C terminus, whereas Q344ter results in a C-terminal truncation, and an intron splice mutation (N88) is thought to remove the entire C-terminal tail of rhodopsin.

Data indicate that expression of truncated rhodopsin negatively affects both photoreceptor function and health, compromising rod cell survival. The presence of truncated opsin may impair synaptic transmission or other cellular processes and eventually cause cell death. Large quantities of mislocalized opsin may decrease the availability of functional proteins in regions where truncated opsin is concentrated. The presence of truncated rhodopsin in the outer segments causes functional abnormalities and localization of rhodopsin in the outer and/or inner segments induces increased photoreceptor cell death.

Rhodopsin endocytosis
Like many other G protein-coupled receptors, the rhodopsin protein undergoes endocytosis following activation. Perturbation of endocytic regulation of rhodopsin has deleterious effects on photoreceptor cell physiology. In certain mutants, rhodopsin and its regulatory protein arrestin form stable complexes. As mentioned these complexes have a fatal effect; when taken up during endocytosis these complexes causes photoreceptor cell death, because the internalized rhodopsin is not degraded in the lysosome but instead accumulates in the late endosomes. The formation of toxic Rhodopsin- Arrestin complexes is also reported for mutants of human rhodopsin associated with severe forms of ADRP. For example, mutations at Arg135 are associated with severe forms of retinitis pigmentosa and exhibit a high affinity for arrestin, undergo endocytosis, and display endosomal abnormalities.

Missense mutations in the opsin gene affecting the R135 and K296 residues of the protein product cause ADRP and result in accumulation of Rhodopsin-Arrestin complexes in the photoreceptor cell. The R135 mutant rhodopsin is noted to form stable complex with arrestin and undergo endocytosis resulting in aberrant endocytic vesicles in HEK cell culture system. Similarly, the K296E rhodopsin is observed to bind the visual arrestin with high affinity. This abnormal interaction is demonstrated to have pathological consequences in the retina. Besides this, the stable rhodopsin and arrestin complexes are shown to mislocalize and accumulate in the inner segments of rod photoreceptors of the mouse model of ADRP.

Using mutants that are defective in late endosome to lysosome trafficking, it was shown that rhodopsin accumulates in endosomal compartments in these mutants and leads to light-dependent retinal degeneration. It was also shown that the internalized rhodopsin in dying photoreceptor cells were not degraded but instead showed characteristics of insoluble proteins. This data led to the implication of rhodopsin buildup in the late endosomal system as a novel trigger of death of photoreceptor neurons. Thus failure to degrade internalized rhodopsin in a timely manner triggers cell death of photoreceptor neurons, suggesting that lysosomal turnover of rhodopsin is vital in maintaining photoreceptor viability.

The precise mechanisms regulating the pro-cell death signaling pathways and their interconnection with endocytosis is not well understood. It is speculated that a component innate to the endolysosomal system plays a crucial role in regulating the cell death signals emanating from the endosomes. This component senses the accumulation of rhodopsin and then engages the proper machinery to execute cell death in the retina. Failure of proper protein degradation and resultant subsequent accumulation of proteins, as in the case of rhodopsin-arrestin complexes, is a well-recognized cause of cell death in many neurodegenerative disorders, such as retinitis pigmentosa.

Non-rhodopsin mutations
Mutations non-retina-specific ADRP genes that encode for proteins essential for pre-mRNA splicing may be a major cause of ADRP. Proteins required for the formation of stable U4/U6 snRNPs and for assembly of the U4/U6.U5 tri-snRNP have been identified, including HPRP3, PRPC8, and PRPF31, proper function of these proteins is necessary for spliceosome performance.

The rhodopsin transcript is a pre-mRNA splicing substrate affected by PRPF31 protein, meaning that rhodopsin (RHO) is among the target splicing substrate genes for PRPF31. Thus it can be understood that mutations in PRPF31 can cause alternative, potentially non-functional, forms of the rhodopsin protein. It was shown that expression of these mutant PRPF31 proteins significantly reduced rhodopsin expression in cultured retinal cells and induced apoptosis of retinal cells, establishing a link between mutations in proteins involved in pre-mRNA splicing and the expression of a critical retina-specific gene, rhodopsin.

This shows that non-rhodopsin mutations may also be critical in presentation of retinal degenerative disorders. It suggests a mechanism for retinal degeneration caused by non-retinal-specific genes, such as PRPF31 mutations.

Notes

References

Eye diseases